Châteauneuf-Grasse, alternatively known as names are Châteauneuf de Grasse or simply Châteauneuf, is a commune in the Alpes-Maritimes department in southeastern France.

Châteauneuf extends across 895 hectares and has a population of over 3,600 inhabitants. It is divided into two districts: Pré-du-Lac, where most of the commerce is found, and Le Vignal.

Population

Personalities
Artist Marina Kulik lives and teaches in Châteauneuf. 
Calouste Gulbenkian lived and is buried in Châteauneuf. 
German actor Anton Diffring also lived and died in Châteauneuf. He was buried at White Colne in England.
Harp maker Victor Salvi lived in Châteauneuf for several years.

See also
Communes of the Alpes-Maritimes department

References

External links
  Châteauneuf official website – general information

Communes of Alpes-Maritimes
Alpes-Maritimes communes articles needing translation from French Wikipedia